Indrit Hithi (born 5 February 1990) is an Albanian association footballer who most recently played for Albanian First Division side Tërbuni, as a defender.

Club career
Hithi previously played for Partizani Tirana and KF Laçi. He has also represented his country at under-17, under-19 and under-21 level.

Career statistics
.

References

External links
 Partizani.Net profile

1990 births
Living people
Footballers from Tirana
Albanian footballers
Association football defenders
Albania youth international footballers
Albania under-21 international footballers
FK Partizani Tirana players
KF Laçi players
Luftëtari Gjirokastër players
KF Tërbuni Pukë players
FC Kamza players
Kategoria Superiore players
Kategoria e Parë players